The Arts, Information and Media Union (KIEM) was a trade union representing workers in various sectors in the Netherlands.

History
The union was founded in 1998, when the Printing and Paper Union merged with the Arts Union.  Like both its predecessors, it affiliated to the Dutch Federation of Trade Unions (FNV).  By 1998, the union had 48,135 members.

On 11 June 2016, the union split, with artists forming a new Arts Union, while other members became direct members of the FNV, forming a new Media and Culture sector.

Presidents
1998: Rene van Tilborg
2003: Lucia Van Westerlaak
2007: 
2013: Geert van der Tang

See also
 FNV Kunsten Informatie en Media v Staat der Nederlanden

External links

References

Entertainment industry unions
Trade unions established in 1998
Trade unions disestablished in 2016
Trade unions in the Netherlands